The Most Beautiful Day may refer to:

 The Most Beautiful Day (album), 1980 album by Polish band Exodus
 The Most Beautiful Day (film), 2016 German film